Wayde may refer to:
 Wayde Bowles (1944–2020), wrestler
 Wayde Butler (born 1969), American football player
 Wayde Compton (born 1972), writer
 Wayde Mills (born 1987), footballer
 Wayde Preston (1929–1992), actor
 Wayde Skipper (born 1983), footballer
 Wayde van Niekerk (born 1992), track and field athlete

See also
 Wade (disambiguation)